The Art Dettman Fishing Shanty is located in Algoma, Wisconsin.

History
Art Dettman served as Mayor of Algoma. He operated a fishing business out of the shanty and it continues to be used for commercial fishing. It was added to the State and the National Register of Historic Places in 1993.

References

Commercial buildings on the National Register of Historic Places in Wisconsin
Industrial buildings and structures on the National Register of Historic Places in Wisconsin
National Register of Historic Places in Kewaunee County, Wisconsin
Late 19th and Early 20th Century American Movements architecture
Commercial buildings completed in 1935
Industrial buildings completed in 1935
Fishing in the United States